Asian Highway 17 (AH17) is a road in the Asian Highway Network that runs entirely in Vietnam. The route starts in Da Nang, follows the National Routes 14B, 14, 13, 51 and ends in Vũng Tàu.

References

Asian Highway Network
Roads in Vietnam